Kingston is an unincorporated community and census-designated place in Beverly and Richfield Townships, Adams County, Illinois, United States. Kingston is located along Illinois Route 104 southeast of Liberty.

A post office called Kingston was established in 1836. The community has the name of James King, a first settler.

Geography 

Demographics
As of the 2020 census there were 20 people, 42 households, and 33 families residing in the CDP. The racial makeup of the CDP was 95.00% White and 5.00% from two or more races.

References

Unincorporated communities in Adams County, Illinois
Unincorporated communities in Illinois